Sons and Daughters is an American drama series that launched from the pilot television movie called Senior Year which aired on CBS from September 11 until November 6, 1974. The show was set in California during the mid-1950s and portrayed the trials of life for two young people — Jeff, portrayed by 24-year-old Gary Frank and Anita, played by 17-year-old Glynnis O'Connor. John S. Ragin portrayed Anita's divorced father, Walter Cramer.

Cast
Gary Frank as Jeff Reed
Debralee Scott as Evie Martinson 
Barry Livingston as Murray "Moose" Kerner 
Jay W. MacIntosh as Lucille Reed
John S. Ragin as Walter Cramer
Glynnis O'Connor as Anita Cramer
Lionel Johnston as Charlie Riddle
Jan Shutan as Ruth Cramer
Scott Colomby as Stanley "Stash" Melnyk

Episodes

External links 
 Television Obscurities - Sons and Daughters
  
 Memorable TV

CBS original programming
1974 American television series debuts
1974 American television series endings
Television series by Universal Television
English-language television shows
Television series set in the 1950s
Television shows set in California
1970s American drama television series